The Adamoli-Cattani fighter was a prototype fighter aircraft designed as a private venture by two Italian aircraft builders in 1918.

Design and development
The Adamoli-Cattani was intended to be the smallest practical biplane around the most powerful engine available to them, a  le Rhône M.  The result was a reasonably conventional design, other than that the wings featured hinged leading edges in place of conventional ailerons.  The Farina Coach Building factory in Turin began construction of the prototype; the Officine Moncenisio in Condove completed it.

Operational history
Upon completion, ground testing revealed that the engine as installed could only deliver some 80% of its rated power, thus leaving the aircraft significantly underpowered. Limited tests continued until the end of World War I, when the Armistice made further development superfluous.

Specifications (estimated performance with 200hp engine)

See also
Comparable aircraft:
 Nieuport-Delage Ni-D 29

References

Single-engined tractor aircraft
1910s Italian fighter aircraft
Military aircraft of World War I
Rotary-engined aircraft
Aircraft first flown in 1918
Biplanes